Norman Joseph Davis (4 August 1904 – 26 August 1966) was an Australian rules footballer who played with North Melbourne in the Victorian Football League (VFL).

Notes

External links 

1904 births
1966 deaths
Australian rules footballers from Melbourne
North Melbourne Football Club players
People from Port Melbourne